For these birds, there is documented evidence of homosexual behavior in one or more of the following kinds: sex, courtship, affection, pair bonding, or parenting, as noted in researcher and author Bruce Bagemihl's 1999 book Biological Exuberance: Animal Homosexuality and Natural Diversity.

According to Bagemihl, animal sexual behavior takes many different forms, even within the same species and the motivations for and implications of their behaviors have yet to be fully understood. Bagemihl's research shows that homosexual behavior, not necessarily sex, has been documented in about 500 species as of 1999, ranging from primates to gut worms. Homosexuality in animals is seen as controversial by social conservatives because it asserts the naturalness of homosexuality in humans, while others counter that it has no implications and is nonsensical to equate animal behavior to morality. Animal preference and motivation is always inferred from behavior. Thus homosexual behavior has been given a number of terms over the years. The correct usage of the term homosexual is that an animal exhibits homosexual behavior, however this article conforms to the usage by modern research applying the term homosexuality to all sexual behavior (copulation, genital stimulation, mating games and sexual display behavior) between animals of the same sex.

This list is part of a larger list of animals displaying homosexual behavior including mammals, insects, fish etc.

Selected images

Birds

 Acorn woodpecker
 Adelie penguin
 American flamingo
 American herring gull
 Anna's hummingbird
 Australian shelduck
 Aztec parakeet
 Bengalese finch (domestic)
 Bank swallow
 Barn owl
 Bearded vulture
 Bicolored antbird
 Black-billed magpie
 Black-Capped Chickadee
 Black-crowned night heron
 Black-headed gull
 Black-rumped flameback
 Black stilt
 Black swan
 Black-winged stilt
 Blue-backed manakin
 Blue-bellied roller
 Blue crowned conure
 Blue tit
 Blue-winged teal
 Brown-headed cowbird
 Budgerigar (domestic)
 Buff-breasted sandpiper
 Calfbird
 California gull
 Canada goose
 Canary-winged parakeet
 Caspian tern
 Cattle egret
 Cockatiel
 Common chaffinch
 Chicken
 Chilean flamingo
 Chiloe wigeon
 Chinstrap penguin
 Cliff swallow
 Common gull
 Common murre
 Common redshank
 Common shelduck
 Crane spp.
 Dusky moorhen
 Domesticated turkey
 Eastern bluebird
 Egyptian goose
 Elegant parrot
 Emu
 Eurasian oystercatcher
 European jay
 European shag
 Galah
 Gentoo penguin
 Golden bishop bird
 Golden plover
 Gray-capped social weaver
 Grey heron
 Great cormorant
 Greater bird of paradise
 Greater flamingo
 Greater rhea
 Green cheek conure
 Green sandpiper
 Greenshank
 Greylag goose
 Griffon vulture
 Guianan cock-of-the-rock
 Guillemot
 Hammerhead (also known as hammerkop)
 Herring gull
 Hoary-headed grebe
 Hooded warbler
 House sparrow
 Humboldt penguin
 Ivory gull
 Jackdaw
 Kestrel
 King penguin
 Kittiwake
 Laughing gull
 Laysan albatross
 Lesser flamingo
 Lesser scaup duck
 Little blue heron
 Little egret
 Long-tailed hermit hummingbird
 Lory spp.
 Mallard
 Masked lovebird
 Mealy amazon parrot
 Mew gull
 Mexican jay
 Musk duck
 Mute swan
 Ocellated antbird
 Ocher-bellied flycatcher
 Orange bishop bird
 Orange-fronted parakeet
 Ornate lorikeet
 Ostrich
 Peach-faced lovebird
 Pied flycatcher
 Pied kingfisher
 Pigeon (domestic)
 Powerful owl
 Purple swamphen
 Raggiana's bird of paradise
 Raven
 Razorbill
 Red-backed shrike
 Red bishop bird
 Red-faced lovebird
 Red-shouldered widowbird
 Regent bowerbird
 Ring-billed gull
 Ring dove
 Rock dove
 Roseate tern
 Rose-ringed parakeet
 Ruff
 Ruffed grouse
 Sage grouse
 San Blas jay
 Sand martin
 Satin bowerbird
 Scarlet ibis
 Scottish crossbill
 Seagull
 Senegal parrot
 Sharp-tailed sparrow
 Silver gull
 Silvery grebe
 Snow goose
 Stitchbird
 Superb lyrebird
 Swallow-tailed manakin
 Tasmanian native hen
 Tree swallow
 Trumpeter swan
 Victoria's riflebird
 Wattled starling
 Western gull
 White-fronted amazon parrot
 White stork
 Wood duck
 Yellow-backed lorikeet
 Yellow-rumped cacique
 Zebra finch (domestic)

See also

Bibliography

Notes

Birds
Homosexual behavior, birds
Homosexual behavior
Avian sexuality